Aavanazhi is a 1986 Indian Malayalam-language action film directed by I. V. Sasi, written by T. Damodaran. The film deals with social and political issues of that time. It stars Mammootty, Geetha, Seema, Sukumaran, Captain Raju, Janardanan, Jagannatha Varma, Innocent, Thikkurisi Sukumaran Nair, Sreenivasan and Sankaradi.

Aavanazhi was the highest grossing Malayalam film at the time and was an industry hit. It was remade in Kannada as "Anthima Theerpu" starring Ambareesh and Geetha, in Tamil as Kadamai Kanniyam Kattupaadu, in Telugu as Marana Sasanam and in Hindi as Satyamev Jayate. I. V. Sasi made two sequels — Inspector Balram in 1991 and Balram vs. Taradas in 2006.

Plot
"Karadi" Balram is an honest CI, who is frustrated after several personal setbacks, including a failed affair of the heart, has turned to drinking and womanizing. Balram is assigned to nab Satyaraj, who evaded the clutches of the cops after murdering Chackochan, a contractor. Balram successfully arrests him, but in court, Satyaraj is represented by Adv. Jayachandran, where he is acquitted by the court, but Balram decides to frame in several other criminal charges pending against him. Usha, Balram's ex-lover, is now married to Jayachandran. Balram falls in love with Seetha, a prostitute, whom he decides to marry. Meanwhile, Radha, a young lady, is determined to avenge herself on Balram, who she believes to have killed her brother while in police custody, but Satyaraj was the one who killed him, on instruction from Vincent. Falsely implicated, Balram had been suspended, but has been reinstated. Though Seetha tries to convince Radha of the truth, she is not ready to accept it. To gain her revenge over Balram, Radha decides to offer Satyaraj a safe stay away from the police eyes. Balram's open fight with Satyaraj forms the rest of the plot.

Cast

 Mammootty as CI Balram
 Geetha as Seetha
 Seema as Radha 
 Nalini as Usha Jayachandran
 Sukumaran as Adv.Jayachandran
 Captain Raju as Sathyaraj
 Janardanan as Vincent
 Innocent as Vishnu
 Sreenivasan as Sreeni
 C. I. Paul as Chandrahasan
 Paravoor Bharathan as Chackochan
 Kundara Johny as CI Alex George
 K. P. A. C. Azeez as Commissioner Azeez
 Sankaradi as Viswanathan
 Jagannatha Varma as DIG Kumar
 Augustine as SI Ummer
 Kunchan as Constable "Samshayam" Vasu
 Shafeeq as Benny Vincent
 Thikkurisi Sukumaran Nair as Nampoothiri
 Kumari Shibi as Jyothi 
 Santhakumari as Radha's Mother
 Prathapachandran
 Hari as Advocate
 Rajan Padoor as Kallan Kuttan
 Amit Amee as Unni/Radha's younger Brother 
 Thiruthiyadu Vilasini as Chackochan's wife
 Sajith Devadas as Nirmal Hasan
 Gorilla Unni as Circle Inspector
 Krishnakkurupp NB
 Aliyar

Release and reception
The film was released on 12 September 1986, in 20 theatres. In 2005, Nana Magazine wrote thst Mammootty has played cop in a total of 25 films from Yavanika to Balram vs Tharadas, but his most memorable police role is that of Inspector Balram from I. V. Sasi's Avanazhi. The film was a major commercial success. It was the highest grossing film at the time. The film ran for more than 200 days in theatres in Kerala.

Remakes
All the remakes of the film were commercial successes.

Sequels 
The movie had two sequels; a 1991 film Inspector Balram and a spiritual successor, Balram vs. Tharadas in which Mammootty reprises his roles from two films, Inspector Balram from Aavanazhi and Tharadas from Athiratram.

Legacy
The film is considered to be one of I.V. Sasi's best works. The film remains to be the only Malayalam Industry hit with a policeman as its central character. The protagonist Inspector Balram remains to be one of the most iconic characters in Malayalam cinema.

References

External links
 

1980s crime action films
1980s Malayalam-language films
1986 films
Films shot in Kozhikode
Films with screenplays by T. Damodaran
Fictional portrayals of the Kerala Police
Indian crime action films
Balram1
Films scored by Shyam (composer)
Malayalam films remade in other languages
Films directed by I. V. Sasi